Manukau Ward is an Auckland Council ward that elects two councillors and covers the Māngere-Ōtāhuhu and Ōtara-Papatoetoe Local Boards. The two councillors are currently Alf Filipaina and Lotu Fuli.

Demographics

Manukau ward had a population of 163,572 at the 2018 New Zealand census, an increase of 16,953 people (11.6%) since the 2013 census, and an increase of 23,097 people (16.4%) since the 2006 census. There were 38,295 households, comprising 81,888 males and 81,684 females, giving a sex ratio of 1.0 males per female. The median age was 29.1 years (compared with 37.4 years nationally), with 41,313 people (25.3%) aged under 15 years, 43,014 (26.3%) aged 15 to 29, 65,655 (40.1%) aged 30 to 64, and 13,596 (8.3%) aged 65 or older.

Ethnicities were 17.8% European/Pākehā, 16.0% Māori, 52.4% Pacific peoples, 27.4% Asian, and 1.5% other ethnicities. People may identify with more than one ethnicity.

The percentage of people born overseas was 42.8, compared with 27.1% nationally.

Although some people chose not to answer the census's question about religious affiliation, 18.5% had no religion, 54.3% were Christian, 1.8% had Māori religious beliefs, 9.0% were Hindu, 4.9% were Muslim, 1.6% were Buddhist and 4.8% had other religions.

Of those at least 15 years old, 15,849 (13.0%) people had a bachelor's or higher degree, and 25,782 (21.1%) people had no formal qualifications. The median income was $25,300, compared with $31,800 nationally. 9,321 people (7.6%) earned over $70,000 compared to 17.2% nationally. The employment status of those at least 15 was that 60,633 (49.6%) people were employed full-time, 13,902 (11.4%) were part-time, and 7,362 (6.0%) were unemployed.

Councillors

Election Results 
Election Results for the Manukau Ward:

2022 Election Results

References

Wards of the Auckland Region